The lingcod or ling cod (Ophiodon  elongatus), also known as the buffalo cod or cultus cod, is a fish of the greenling family Hexagrammidae. It is the only extant member of the genus Ophiodon. A slightly larger, extinct species, Ophiodon ozymandias, is known from fossils from the Late Miocene of Southern California.Ophiodon  elongatus is native to the North American west coast from Shumagin Islands in the Gulf of Alaska to Baja California, Mexico.
It is spotted in various shades of gray. The lingcod is a popular eating fish, and is thus prized by anglers. Though not closely related to either ling or cod, the name "lingcod" originated because it somewhat resembles those fish. Around 20% of lingcods have blue-green to turquoise flesh.p. 298 The colour is destroyed by cooking. The colour may be due to biliverdin, but this has not been established beyond doubt.

 Distribution and lifecycle 

Lingcod are endemic to the west coast of North America, with the center of abundance off the coast of British Columbia. They are found on the bottom, with most individuals occupying rocky areas at depths of 10 to 100 m (32 to 328 ft). Tagging studies have shown lingcod are a largely nonmigratory species, with colonization and recruitment occurring in localized areas only.

Starting in October, lingcod migrate to nearshore spawning grounds. The males migrate first, and establish nest sites in strong current areas in rock crevices or on ledges. Spawning takes place between December and March, and females leave the nest site immediately after depositing eggs. Males actively defend the nest from predators until the eggs hatch in early March through late April. 

The larvae are pelagic until late May or early June, when they settle to the bottom as juveniles. Initially they inhabit eelgrass beds, then move to flat, sandy areas that are not the typical habitat of older lingcod. They eventually settle in habitats of similar relief and substrate as older lingcod, but remain at shallower depths for several years.

Females and males mature at age three to five years and two years of age, respectively. An adult male can be distinguished externally from a female by the presence of a small, conical papilla behind the anal vent. After age two, females grow faster than males, with the growth of males tapering off at about age eight, and females continuing to grow until about age 12 to 14. Off the coast of Alaska, many reach .

Lingcod are voracious predators, feeding on nearly anything they can fit in their mouths, including invertebrates and many species of fish, such as herring (Clupea pallasii), salmon, and Pacific hake (Merluccius productus). One of their favorite foods is smaller octopuses, and they also readily devour large rockfish. Lingcod that survive the larval stages have few predators themselves, and are vulnerable mainly to marine mammals, such as sea lions and harbor seals.

Age determination 
In 1977, Dr. Dick Beamish and Doris Chilton of the Pacific Biological Station published an article showing that cross sections of the fourth to eighth fin rays from the second dorsal fin provided a method for estimating the age of lingcod.Chilton, D.E. and R.J. Beamish. 1982. Age determination methods for fishes studied by the Groundfish Program at the Pacific Biological Station. Can. Spec. Publ. Fish. Aquat. Sci. 60: 102 p. This method has since been validated by a mark-recapture study in which lingcod received an injection of oxytetracycline. Other methods of aging, such as those using scales and otoliths, were found to underestimate ages for older fish.

Ages are determined from fins in much the same manner as for other aging structures: sections of varying thickness are examined under a microscope, and the annuli, or rings, that are formed for each year of growth are counted and used to estimate the age. The cross sections must be made at right angles to the length of the fin ray, and it is therefore important that fins be dried flat, with the cut surface at right angles to the fin rays. In addition, the distance the section is cut from the fin ray base is important, so all fins should be collected with the bases intact.McFarlane, G.A., and J.R. King. The validity of the fin-ray method of age determination for lingcod (Ophiodon elongatus). Fish. Bull. 99: 459-464.

One problem associated with using fin rays to age older fish is the center may be resorbed, resulting in the loss of the first two annuli. It is therefore necessary to determine an average width for the first two annuli by examining the fins from juvenile fish. This measurement can then be used to estimate the position of the third annulus on older fish.

Gallery

ReferencesThis article incorporates material from Fisheries and Oceans Canada. This reproduction was not done in affiliation with or with the endorsement of Fisheries and Oceans Canada.External links
 Lingcod NOAA FishWatch''. Retrieved 5 November 2012.

Hexagrammidae
Western North American coastal fauna
Fauna of the San Francisco Bay Area
Fish described in 1854